Aleksanteri Saarvala (9 April 1913 – 7 October 1989) was a Finnish gymnast and Olympic champion. He competed at the 1936 Summer Olympics in Berlin where he received a gold medal in horizontal bar, and a bronze medal in team combined exercises.

1948 Olympics
Saarvala also participated at the 1948 Summer Olympics in London, where he finished shared 4th in horizontal bar, and 17th all-around. The Finnish team won gold medals, but as he was 7th best Finn he did not receive a medal.

References

External links
 

 

1913 births
1989 deaths
Finnish male artistic gymnasts
Gymnasts at the 1936 Summer Olympics
Gymnasts at the 1948 Summer Olympics
Olympic gymnasts of Finland
Olympic gold medalists for Finland
Olympic medalists in gymnastics
Medalists at the 1948 Summer Olympics
Medalists at the 1936 Summer Olympics
Olympic bronze medalists for Finland
20th-century Finnish people